The AMP was a youth center and music venue in Minot, North Dakota, United States. Established in October 2003 by Billy Luetzen, the AMP provided a place for local youth to hang out, and on most weekends staged a concert. Generally concerts had a lot of punk rock, but indie and acoustic acts played there. The AMP also organized film and theatre events.

The predecessor of AMP was the Liberty Social Tavern.

History
In September 2003, following the closure of the Liberty, a group of people met at the Minot Public Library to discuss the future of live performance in the city. This artists, musicians, and performers group led by Billy Luetzen found a location for a new venue with an owner willing to allow preemptible use of the building for virtually no cost; an abandoned fur and leather factory in northeast Minot.

The building, at 412 3rd St NW, was renovated over the course of a month, and the first concerts were held in October 2003.

In July 2004, the AMP was forced to close its first location when the building owner found a renter. The AMP organized events at the Taube Museum of Art and the Minot Public Library over the summer of 2004. There was considerable controversy over a show held in September 2004, a film festival put on by a travelling group espousing borderline criminal activities. The manager of the Dakota Square Mall asked the president of Minot State University to cancel the show, which was then scheduled to take place at the Aleshire Theatre on campus. Following a row with several professors over censorship concerns the show was reinstated, but by that time a room at the Public Library had already been rented and fliers advertising the show at the Library, and the show took place there.

Soon thereafter, the building of a closed downtown curio and scrapbook shop was offered to Luetzen, and on 30 October 2004 the AMP held its first concert at a location downtown, at 106 South Main Street. In February 2006, the owner sold the building to developers, and the AMP was forced to return to finding venues for shows on an ad-hoc basis.

Notable acts that have played at the AMP

burnthe8track
The Robot Ate Me
Southerly
Sycamore Smith
The White Foliage
Defiance Ohio

External links
The AMP website

Youth organizations based in North Dakota
Music venues in North Dakota
Music venues completed in 2003
Music venues in Minot, North Dakota
2003 establishments in North Dakota